The Diamond League is an annual series of elite track and field athletic competitions comprising fourteen of the best invitational athletics meetings. The series sits in the top tier of the World Athletics (formerly known as the IAAF) one-day meeting competitions. 

The inaugural season was in 2010. It was designed to replace the IAAF Golden League, which had been held annually since 1998. The full sponsorship name is the Wanda Diamond League, the result of an agreement with Wanda Group that was announced in December 2019.

While the Golden League was formed to increase the profile of the leading European athletics competitions, the Diamond League's aim is to "enhance the worldwide appeal of athletics by going outside Europe for the first time." In addition to the original Golden League members (except Berlin) and other traditional European competitions, the series now includes events in China, Qatar, Morocco, and the United States.

Beginning in March 2022, after the 2022 Russian invasion of Ukraine, the Diamond League excluded Russian and Belarusian athletes from all of its track and field meetings.

Editions

The number in the table represents the order in which the meeting took place.

In March 2019 the president of the IAAF, Sebastian Coe, announced changes in the Diamond League's format for the 2020 series. The number of Diamond Disciplines was reduced from 32 to 24 and a second Chinese meet was added to the calendar. The dual final format was replaced by a single final. However, because of the COVID-19 pandemic, 7 of the originally planned 15 meets were cancelled, the season was delayed to June 10th, only four or the meets had a full competitive program, and the final was cancelled with no champions crowned in 2020.
In December 2020, the 2021 Diamond League was announced to return with 32 disciplines and a two-hour broadcast window.

Scoring system 

The original Diamond League scoring system, used from 2010 to 2015, awarded points to the top three athletes at each meeting (4 points for first place; 2 points for second place; 1 point for third place). Each of the thirty-two disciplines (sixteen each for male and female athletes) was staged a total of seven times during the season; points scored in the final meeting for that discipline (either Zürich or Brussels) were doubled. The athletes who finished the season with the highest number of points in their discipline won the "Diamond Race"; in case of a tie on points, the number of victories was used as the first tie-breaker, followed by the results of the final. Only athletes who competed in their discipline's final meeting were eligible to win the Diamond Race. In 2016 scoring was expanded to the top six (10–6–4–3–2–1); double points (20–12–8–6–4–2) were still awarded in the event finals.

A completely new system was introduced in 2017; the top eight athletes at each meeting are now awarded points (8–7–6–5–4–3–2–1), but these points only determine which athletes qualify for the discipline finals in Zürich and Brussels. The athletes who win at the finals are declared IAAF Diamond League Champions, and the allocation of the overall prize money is likewise determined solely by the results of the final. This system, with the winner of the final automatically winning the overall championship, is similar to the former IAAF Grand Prix circuit with its Grand Prix Final. As part of the scoring changes, the term 'Diamond Race' is no longer used. Instead, athletes compete in 'Diamond Disciplines' to become the Diamond League champion.

After the 2019 season, the final format changed from being held by two separate meets to one meet.

Meetings
All meetings since the event's inauguration have been held in the Northern Hemisphere in spring and summer months, in line with the traditional international track and field season. 

From 2011 to 2019 the British Grand Prix was held at the Alexander Stadium, Birmingham
The 2010 to 2012 London Grand Prix (now known as the Anniversary Games) was held at Crystal Palace National Sports Centre and the 2014 event was moved to Hampden Park in Glasgow as a pre-Games meet for the 2014 Commonwealth Games.
The 2010 to 2016 Meeting de Paris was held at the Stade de France.
In 2016 the Adidas Grand Prix in New York City was removed in favour of the Rabat leg (the first African meet of the series).
The 2019 Prefontaine Classic moved from Eugene to Cobb Track and Angell Field in Stanford due to the reconstruction of Hayward Field.
In 2021 and 2023, the Golden Gala moved from Rome to Stadio Luigi Ridolfi in Florence.
Meetings may hold non-Diamond League race events e.g. the 10,000 m in Stockholm on 30 May 2019.
Diamond League meetings in Shanghai and Shenzen were planned for 2021 and 2022 but were cancelled due to the COVID-19 pandemic. A meeting in Chorzów was scheduled instead.

Diamond League winners

Men (2010–2016, overall winners)

Men (2017–present, winners of final events)

Women (2010–2016, overall winners)

Women (2017–present, winners of final events)

Statistics

Countries by number of event winners

Most titles by athlete

Multi event title winners

Perfect Diamond Races

Diamond League records

Men

Women

 WR: World Record - AR: Area Record - NR: National Record - OWB: Outdoor World Best

References

Diamond league records
Diamond League Records – Men. all-athletics.com. Retrieved on 2015-05-30.
Diamond League Records – Women. all-athletics.com. Retrieved on 2015-05-30.

External links
Official website

 
Recurring sporting events established in 2010
Annual athletics series
Diamond League